Rafael Bruno Cajueiro da Silva (born 18 July 1992), known as Rafael Carioca, is a Brazilian footballer who plays for Urartu.

Career

Vitória
On 10 December 2019 Vitória announced the signing of Rafael for the 2020 season.

Urartu
On 25 January 2023, Armenian Premier League club Urartu announced the signing of Carioca.

Career statistics

References

External links

1992 births
Living people
Association football midfielders
Campeonato Brasileiro Série A players
Campeonato Brasileiro Série B players
Campeonato Brasileiro Série C players
Vila Nova Futebol Clube players
Sport Club Internacional players
Resende Futebol Clube players
Sociedade Esportiva e Recreativa Caxias do Sul players
Paraná Clube players
Ceará Sporting Club players
Clube de Regatas Brasil players
Red Bull Brasil players
Red Bull Bragantino players
Esporte Clube Vitória players
Footballers from Rio de Janeiro (city)
Brazilian footballers